Major Dodson (born July 8, 2003) is an American actor known for his roles on The Walking Dead, American Horror Story and Left Behind.

Career

Dodson began acting professionally at the age of six, he had many small roles until his first major television appearance on Revolution.  His most notable roles are as Corey on American Horror Story and Sam on The Walking Dead.

Charity
Dodson is actively involved in Smiles for the Homeless, a charity his family helped create, that makes care packages for homeless individuals.

Personal life
Dodson has autism.

Filmography

Film

Television

Video Games

Awards and nominations

References

External links

Website

Living people
American male child actors
2003 births
21st-century American male actors
American male film actors
Male actors from Dallas
American male television actors
Actors with autism